The Joseph E. Muller Bridge is a crossing of the Connecticut River in Western Massachusetts, connecting the communities of Holyoke and South Hadley. The bridge carries U.S. Route 202 (US 202).

History and construction of the bridge 

The bridge was constructed in 1958 as part of a new bypass of U.S. Route 202 (Purple Heart Drive). The bypass was built in anticipation of increased traffic through downtown Holyoke heading towards South Hadley from Interstate 91, which was under construction at the time. Prior to the construction of the bridge, Route 202 used the nearby South Hadley Falls bridge (Vietnam Memorial Bridge) to cross the Connecticut River.

The bridge was named as a memorial to Holyoke native Joseph E. Muller, a recipient of the Medal of Honor.

See also 
 
 
 
 List of crossings of the Connecticut River

References 

 Bridge Inventory Record on NationalBridges.com.

Bridges over the Connecticut River
Buildings and structures in Holyoke, Massachusetts
Bridges completed in 1958
Beam bridges in the United States
Bridges in Hampden County, Massachusetts
Bridges in Hampshire County, Massachusetts
Road bridges in Massachusetts
U.S. Route 202
Bridges of the United States Numbered Highway System
Steel bridges in the United States